

The Aiyy Faith is a neo-Tengrist Yakut religious organization that has been registered since 2015 in Yakutsk, Sakha Republic (Yakutia), Russia. This organization, formerly known as Kut-Siur ( — Heart-Soul-Mind) was founded in 1990 and established in 1993 in Yakutsk.

Teachings 

Aiyy (Tangra)—the Creator God—lives in the 9th Heaven. All the other 63 deities of the Yakut pantheon are his manifestations (compare avatars in Hinduism). "White shamans" serve him (while it is forbidden to turn to the "black shamans" of Yakut paganism). Man consists of three souls (Kut): the soul-earth, soul-air, and soul-mother, which return to Aiyy upon the physical body's death. When some traditionalists ask about the sources of this teaching, he replies that he received such teachings from a "white old spirit".

The main posts, or offices, of this organization are the Philosopher and the Toyon (Tribal chief). It has the Aiyy houses and yurts in the villages in which common prayers and bloodless sacrifices with fermented mare's milk are performed. The doctrine influenced the content of teaching national culture in schools and especially on the training of personnel at the local College of Culture.

History 

Its founder is philologist Lazar Afanasyev, PhD, known also by his ethnic name Téris, who studied shamanism in the Soviet years. His teaching is a monotheistically modernized Yakut version of Tengrism and is set forth in the book "Teachings of Aiyy."

From the very beginning, the organization collaborated closely with the Yakut national movement "The Future of the Yakuts" (Sakha Kaskile) led by Ivan Ukhkhan. Together they requested from the beginning of the 1990s permission to construct the temple: in 1999, by a decree of the republican authorities, the House of Purification (Archie Diete), a wood, glass and metal wonder composed in the form of three gigantic yurts, was laid down and opened in 2002. However, back in 2001, the local Orthodox archbishop sharply criticized the construction of the "pagan temple" (kapishche). And after the new President of Yakutia was elected in 2002, the pro-Orthodox course of the authorities began, and so representatives of ethnic religions ceased to be invited to inter-religious meetings. The House of Purification was taken away and transferred to the city, which turned it into a house of culture. Religious and political activists demand its return, as well as the "Three Birch" National Park promised by the authorities and a pagan school in Yakutsk. However, the authorities stopped trying to prevent the spread of Aiyy Faith at the grassroots level in the villages.

See also 
 List of Tengrist movements

Footnotes

References

Primary sources 
 
 

Tengriism
Modern pagan organizations based in Russia
Religious organizations established in 2015
Religion in Siberia
Modern pagan organizations established in the 2010s